Dave Billings (born 1953) was a selector for the Dublin senior football team. He worked under the management of Paul Caffrey along with his co-selectors Brian Talty and Paul Clarke. Billings was previously a co-selector along with Paul Caffrey and Paddy Canning when Tommy Lyons was manager of the Dublin Gaelic football team between from 2001 to 2004. He is a UCD Commerce graduate and was in charge of all Gaelic games on the UCD campus.

Billings died on 14 April 2015.

References

2015 deaths
Gaelic games players from County Dublin
Gaelic football selectors
1953 births